Hernes Church is a parish church of the Church of Norway in Elverum Municipality in Innlandet county, Norway. It is located in the village of Hernes. It is the church for the Hernes parish which is part of the Sør-Østerdal prosti (deanery) in the Diocese of Hamar. The white, stone church was built in a long church design in 1935 using plans drawn up by the architect Gunnar Bjerke. The church seats about 250 people.

History

Planning for a new church in Hernes began in the first part of the 20th century, before World War II. The architect Gunnar Bjerke was hired to design the new church. Construction on the building took place in 1935. It is a stone church with a rectangular nave and a choir on the east end. There are two sacristies on the north side of the nave and an asymmetrically placed tower on the west end of the nave. The building was consecrated on 4 October 1935. In 2005, there was a fire in the church due to a problem with the electrical system. The building was repaired afterwards.

See also
List of churches in Hamar

References

Elverum
Churches in Innlandet
Long churches in Norway
Stone churches in Norway
20th-century Church of Norway church buildings
Churches completed in 1935
1935 establishments in Norway